A worm shoe is a strip of wood such as oak or pine which is fixed to the keel of a wooden boat to protect it from shipworms.  The wood is sacrificed to the worms while the main structure is kept separate and safe using a layer of tar paper or creosoted felt, which the worms will not penetrate.

References

External links
 Putting the Worm Shoe on the Keel Bottom — demonstration by a boat-builder

Shipbuilding